The 1977 Dayton Pro Tennis Classic, was a men's tennis tournament played on indoor carpet courts at the Dayton Convention Center in Dayton, Ohio, in the United States that was part of the 1977 Grand Prix. It was the fourth edition of the event and was held from February 2 through February 6, 1977. Unseeded Jeff Borowiak won the singles title and earned $10,000 first-prize money as well as 50 Grand Prix ranking points.

Finals

Singles
 Jeff Borowiak defeated  Buster Mottram 6–4, 4–6, 6–4
 It was Borowiak's 1st singles title of the year and the 3rd of his career.

Doubles
 Hank Pfister /  Butch Walts defeated  Jeff Borowiak /  Andrew Pattison 6–4, 7–6

References

External links
 ITF tournament edition details

Dayton Pro Tennis Classic
Dayton Pro Tennis Classic
Dayton Pro Tennis Classic